Games That Lovers Play may refer to:

 Games That Lovers Play (film), 1971
 "Games That Lovers Play" (song), 1966